Corey Brown (born 7 January 1994) is an Australian soccer player who last played as a left back for Brisbane Roar in the A-League.

He is the son of Rod Brown, who scored for Brisbane Strikers in the 1997 NSL Grand Final and held the record for most NSL goals scored (137 goals) playing throughout the 1980s and 1990s with Marconi, APIA-Leichhardt, Newcastle Breakers and Brisbane Strikers.

Club career
Brown attended a Brisbane all boys school, from grades 5 through to 10; Marist College Ashgrove. In 2009, Brown was awarded a scholarship with the Queensland Academy of Sport at the age of 15. Whilst he was at and played for the QAS, he played on loan for Brisbane City but did not make a senior appearance. In 2010, he was offered a scholarship with the AIS, which he accepted. He made numerous appearances for them in the National Youth League.

On 23 September 2011, it was announced that Brown, who had been on trial for several weeks, had secured a contract with the Brisbane Roar. Brown signed a three-year deal with the club as a player on a full-time youth contract, which allowed him to be on the first team roster but be paid outside of the salary cap.

On 16 May 2012, Brown made his debut at senior level for Brisbane Roar against Chinese side Beijing Guoan in the Champions League, filling in for the injured Shane Stefanutto.

Since then Brown has gone from strength to strength with the Roar, winning the players' player of the season (Gary Wilkins Medal) at the club in the 2016–17 season.

On 27 April 2018, Brisbane Roar confirmed Brown's departure following an approach from Melbourne Victory. Two months later, he officially signed a two-year contract with Melbourne Victory.

On 17 January 2020, Victory released Brown and he rejoined the Brisbane Roar.

On 18 August 2022, Brisbane Roar released a statement advising the termination of Corey Brown's contract.

Career statistics

References

External links
 Brisbane Roar profile

1994 births
A-League Men players
Brisbane Roar FC players
Melbourne Victory FC players
Soccer players from Brisbane
Association football defenders
Australian Institute of Sport soccer players
Sportsmen from Queensland
Living people
Australian soccer players